Baraboo–Wisconsin Dells Airport  is a public use airport located three nautical miles (6 km) northwest of the central business district of Baraboo, in Sauk County, Wisconsin, United States. The airport is located between Baraboo and Lake Delton, Wisconsin, on US 12, and is adjacent to the Ho-Chunk Casino.

It is included in the Federal Aviation Administration (FAA) National Plan of Integrated Airport Systems for 2021–2025, in which it is categorized as a regional general aviation facility.

Although most U.S. airports use the same three-letter location identifier for the FAA and IATA, this airport is assigned DLL by the FAA but has no designation from the IATA (which assigned DLL to Dillon County Airport in Dillon, South Carolina).

History
It was originally known as Berry's Dells Airport. It was built and owned by Clinton DeWitt Berry in 1928, the proprietor of Berry's Coldwater Canyon Hotel and Golf Course, now part of the Chula Vista Resort. The airport originally comprised 60 acres and was designated on government maps as beacon No. 19. It was also on the Milwaukee-Minneapolis route to the northern airways. Upon announcing the opening of the landing field on May 26, 1928, Berry said, "I look for large numbers of planes from Chicago, St. Louis and other cities to carry visitors to the Dells this summer". Clinton Berry was the uncle of Robert Irwin Berry, owner of Berry Electric Contracting Company in Chicago, Illinois. Robert Berry was the grandfather of Robert Forbis, who used the airfield many times in his Lancair Columbia 300 aircraft.

Facilities and aircraft

Dells VORTAC is 1 mile north of the airfield.

Baraboo–Dells Flight Center, Inc., is the fixed-base operator.

For the 12-month period ending April 9, 2021, the airport had 30,000 aircraft operations, an average of 82 per day: 89% general aviation, 8% military and 3% air taxi.

In January 2023, there were 54 aircraft based at this airport: 44 single-engine, 3 multi-engine, 6 jet and 1 glider.

Cargo operations 

In 2017, aircraft flight tracking showed Freight Runners Express flying their Beechcraft Model 99 aircraft type for Wisconsin Dells cargo operations.

See also
 Cirrus Aircraft, whose first headquarters were located on the airport
 List of airports in Wisconsin

References

External links 
 Baraboo–Wisconsin Dells Airport at Wisconsin DOT Airport Directory
 Baraboo–Dells Flight Center, Inc., the airport's fixed-base operator (FBO)

Airports in Wisconsin
Airports in Sauk County, Wisconsin
Wisconsin Dells, Wisconsin
Baraboo, Wisconsin